Calton, Ontario is a hamlet within the township of Malahide in Elgin County, Ontario, Canada.

References
Atlas of Canada

External links
County of Elgin website
The St.Thomas - Elgin Tourist Association - Calton Swamp Wildlife Management Area

Communities in Elgin County